Dirhinosia cervinella is a moth of the family Gelechiidae. It is found in Russia (the southern Ural, the Caucasus, Altai, Lower Volga), Ukraine, Bulgaria, Hungary, Croatia and Turkey.

The wingspan is 16–18 mm. The forewings are ochreous brown, mottled with yellowish scales near the base. The hindwings are brown to dark brown. Adults have been recorded on wing from June to July.

References

Moths described in 1844
Dirhinosia
Moths of Europe
Moths of Asia